Tanja Kolbe (born 7 September 1990) is a German former competitive ice dancer. With Stefano Caruso, she won seven international medals and two German national silver medals. They placed eighth at the 2013 European Championships and competed at the 2014 Winter Olympics, finishing 19th.

Personal life 
Tanja Kolbe was born 7 September 1990 in Berlin, Germany. She studied business communication in Berlin and has worked for the Bundeswehr's sports group. She and her partner, Alexander Nissen, have a son named Moritz, born on 11 October 2015.

Career

Early career 
From 2003 to 2006, Kolbe competed with Paul Boll. They won the 2006 German national junior title and were sent to the 2006 World Junior Championships where they placed 16th.

In 2006, Kolbe teamed up with Sascha Rabe. In their first season together, they competed on the junior level. They appeared at two ISU Junior Grand Prix events and took the silver medal at the German Junior Championships. The next three season, Kolbe/Rabe competed on the senior level. They took bronze at the 2009 German Championships. After Rabe decided to retire in 2010, she had a tryout with Deividas Stagniūnas of Lithuania.

Partnership with Caruso 
Kolbe teamed up with Italian ice dancer Stefano Caruso in 2010. In their first season together, they took bronze at the 2010 Ice Challenge and at the 2011 German Championships.

In their second season together, Kolbe/Caruso won two international medals, gold at the 2011 NRW Trophy and bronze at the Istanbul Cup. They took the silver medal at the German Championships and were assigned to the 2012 European Championships where they finished 12th. The duo split up after the event but teamed up again in July 2012.

In the 2012–13 season, Kolbe/Caruso took silver again at the German Championships and earned another trip to the European Championships where they finished 8th. They won two international medals – bronze at both the New Year's Cup and Volvo Open Cup.

In the 2013–14 season, Kolbe/Caruso were invited to their first Grand Prix event, the 2013 Trophee Eric Bompard where they placed 7th. They added two more international medals to their collection – bronze at the 2013 Ondrej Nepela Trophy and Ice Challenge. In February 2014, Kolbe/Caruso competed at the Winter Olympics in Sochi and finished 19th. They announced the end of their partnership in June 2014.

Programs

With Caruso

With Rabe

With Boll

Competitive highlights 
GP = Grand Prix; JGP = Junior Grand Prix

With Caruso

With Rabe

With Boll

References

External links 

 
 
 
 Tanja Kolbe / Stefano Caruso official website

1990 births
Living people
German female ice dancers
Figure skaters from Berlin
Figure skaters at the 2014 Winter Olympics
Olympic figure skaters of Germany
20th-century German women
21st-century German women